Elk is the second album by Inga Liljeström. It was released in 2005, seven years after her first album, Urchin.

Track listing
"Film Noir" - 5:03
"Phoenix" - 4:11
"Lira" - 5:06
"Knotted" - 5:10
"All of This" - 3:28
"Glow" - 4:45
"Diamond Horseshoe" - 3:47
"Deer" - 4:42
"29 Poisons" - 5:42
"Stardust" - 5:37
"Bullet" - 4:58
"Stolen" - 3:33
"Ghostlike" - 4:21 (hidden track)

References

2005 albums
Inga Liljeström albums